The 2012 Lermontov Cup was a professional tennis tournament played on clay courts. It was the first edition of the tournament which was part of the 2012 ATP Challenger Tour. It took place in Lermontov, Russia between 24 and 30 September 2012.

Singles main draw entrants

Seeds

 1 Rankings are as of September 17, 2012.

Other entrants
The following players received wildcards into the singles main draw:
  Victor Baluda
  Ruslan Chomaev
  Ervand Gasparyan
  Richard Muzaev

The following players received entry from the qualifying draw:
  Toni Androić
  James Duckworth
  Michal Schmid
  Yuri Schukin

Champions

Singles

 Andrey Kuznetsov def.  Farrukh Dustov, 6–7(7–9), 6–2, 6–2

Doubles

 Konstantin Kravchuk /  Denys Molchanov def.  Andrey Golubev /  Yuri Schukin, 6–3, 6–4

External links

Lermontov Cup
Lermontov Cup
2012 in Russian tennis